Knights of the Night is a 1928 German silent film directed by Max Reichmann and starring Ivan Koval-Samborsky, and La Jana.

The film's art direction was by Leopold Blonder.

Cast

References

Bibliography

External links

1928 films
Films of the Weimar Republic
German silent feature films
Films directed by Max Reichmann
German black-and-white films
1920s German films